Qezel Hajjilu (also Romanized as Qezel Ḩājjīlū) is a village in Bash Qaleh Rural District, in the Central District of Urmia County, West Azerbaijan Province, Iran. At the 2006 census, its population was 225, in 64 families.

References 

Populated places in Urmia County